The Jaisalmer Folklore Museum is a natural history museum located on the banks of Garsisar Lake, in Mehar Bagh Garden, Jaisalmer, in the Indian state of Rajasthan. The museum was founded by NK Sharma.  The museum has different sections such as photographs section, costumes, fossils, ornaments of horses and camels, jewellery, and coterie of paintings. Videos of music instruments and traditional dances can be seen in the museum.

There is an entry charge to visit the museum.

References

External links 

Museums in Rajasthan
Natural history museums in India
Jaisalmer
Folk museums in Asia
Rajasthani folklore
Indian folk culture